Hinduism is a minority religion practised by 0.6% of the population of Switzerland. Approximately 90% of Hindu adherents are foreign-born, and about a third of them have the status of refugee or asylum seeker. The Sri Sivasubramaniar Temple, located in the Sihl Valley in Adliswil, is the most famous and oldest Hindu temple in Switzerland, the Arulmihu Sivan Temple located in Glattbrugg is dedicated to Shiva, and the latest foundation is the Sri Vishnu Thurkkai Amman Temple in Dürnten in 2010.

History

The first yoga school in this country was founded 70 years ago. The Hungarian pianist and sculptor Elisabeth Haich moved from Budapest to Zurich in the 1940s, together with her Indian husband and doctor Selvarajan Yesudian. Together they opened in 1948 the first yoga school in Switzerland. Although yoga today is understood primarily as a form of relaxation and exercise, it still arouses interest among many practitioners in Hinduism, knowing that yoga originally had a deeply religious-spiritual approach. The first Indian monk who founded an association in Switzerland was Swami Omkarananda, who founded the Divine Light Center in Winterthur in 1966. In the early 1970s, the Osho community under the leadership of Bhagwan Shree Rajneesh and the ISKCON (International Society for Krishna Consciousness), founded by Swami Prabhupada, also spread.

The Srilankan Tamil Hindus came to switzerland as refugees during the ethnic conflict in 1983 .While in the early days, the Krishna Temple on Zürichberg, which was opened in 1980, provided a first refuge for many Tamils, various communities formed over the years, so that in 1986 the first Tamil temple was opened in Basel. More temple openings followed in all parts of Switzerland, so there are over 20 different Tamil Hindu temples today.

Demographics
In earlier censuses, Hinduism figured together with other non-Abrahamic traditions (mainly Buddhism) as "other churches and communities". These accounted for 0.12% in 1970, 0.19% in 1980, 0.42% in 1990 and 0.78% in 2000 (0.38% Hinduism, 0.29% Buddhism, 0.11% other). Hinduism overtook Judaism as the third largest religion in Switzerland (after Christianity and Islam) during the 1990s and was tied at 0.38% with the New Apostolic Church in 2000.

The 2000 census reported 27,839 residents of Switzerland self-identifying as Hindus (0.38% of the total population; 1.11% in Bern, 1% in Zurich, 0.27% in Geneva). Most of them are Sri Lankan Tamils (81.2%). 

In 2017, Hindus constituted 0.6% of the population of Switzerland. There are about 50,000 Hindus in Switzerland. There is also an ISKCON community in Switzerland with about 400 members and a circle of about 2000 friends and sympathizers.

Hindu Associations
"Schweizerischen Dachverband für Hinduismus" or The Swiss Federation for Hinduism (www.hindus.ch) is the main Hindu association in Switzerland.It was formed in 2017.

See also
Religion in Switzerland
Hinduism in Finland
List of Hindu temples in Switzerland

References

 2000 census results (Swiss federal statistics office)
Swiss Tamils look to preserve their culture, Swissinfo,   February 18, 2006.

External links 

 

 
Switzerland
Religion in Switzerland